Hélcio de Paiva (born 2 October 1903, date of death unknown), known as just Hélcio, was a Brazilian footballer. He played in three matches for the Brazil national football team in 1925. He was also part of Brazil's squad for the 1925 South American Championship.

References

1903 births
Year of death missing
Brazilian footballers
Brazil international footballers
Place of birth missing
Association footballers not categorized by position